Patrick Thaler (born March 23, 1978) is a retired World Cup alpine ski racer from northern Italy. Born in Bolzano, South Tyrol, he specialized in the slalom.  Thaler competed for Italy at the 2006, 2010 and 2014 Winter Olympics but failed to finish. His best result from Alpine World Ski Championships is a seventh place in Val-d'Isère, France, in 2009.

Career
During his World Cup career, he reached three third-place finishes in the slalom – twice at Kitzbühel, Austria, and once at Val d'Isère. In addition, he has 25 top-10 finishes. He is one of the oldest (35 years, 10 months, 2 days) slalom skiers to have finished in the top-3 in the World cup (in 2014) and the oldest (38 years, 11 months, 11 days) to have finished in the top-10 (in 2017).

Thaler retired from ski racing on January 23, 2018, after having competed in the World Cup for a record of 22 seasons (1997–2018).

World Cup results

Season standings

Race podiums
 3 podiums – (3 SL)

Olympic results

World Championships results

References

External links
 
 Fischer Skis – athletes – Patrick Thaler
 Italian Winter Sports Federation – (FISI) – alpine skiing – Patrick Thaler – 

1978 births
Living people
Italian male alpine skiers
Olympic alpine skiers of Italy
Alpine skiers at the 2006 Winter Olympics
Alpine skiers at the 2010 Winter Olympics
Germanophone Italian people
Alpine skiers at the 2014 Winter Olympics
Alpine skiers of Centro Sportivo Carabinieri
Sportspeople from Bolzano